Tim Metcalfe may refer to:

 Tim Metcalfe (Coronation Street), a character on the British soap opera Coronation Street
 Tim Metcalfe (musician) (born 1988), songwriter and producer

See also
 Tim Metcalf, Australian poet and doctor